is a 1985 Japanese film directed by Tatsumi Kumashiro.

Cast
Kenichi Hagiwara 
Mitsuko Baisho 
Tomoyoshi Wada
Keiko Takahashi 
Kaoru Kobayashi 
Noboru Nakaya
Tokie Hidari
Isao Hashizume
Eiichi Kudo

Awards and nominations
10th Hochi Film Award 
 Won: Best Actress - Mitsuko Baisho

References

1985 films
Films directed by Tatsumi Kumashiro
1980s Japanese-language films
1980s Japanese films